Humberto Parra (born 3 September 1964) is a former Colombian racing cyclist. He rode in the 1989 Tour de France and the 1989 Vuelta a España. His brothers, Fabio and Iván were also racing cyclist.

References

External links
 

1964 births
Living people
Colombian male cyclists
People from Sogamoso
Sportspeople from Boyacá Department